Hasan Langi-ye Pain (also Romanized as Ḩasan Langī-ye Pā’īn; also known as Ḩasan Langī) is a village in Shamil Rural District, Takht District, Bandar Abbas County, Hormozgan Province, Iran. At the 2006 census, its population was 888, in 186 families.

References 

Populated places in Bandar Abbas County